Hayat El Ghazi (born 1979) is a Moroccan hammer thrower.

She won the bronze medals at the 2002 and 2004 African Championships. In 2003, she threw a national record throw of 60.43 metres.

In 2007 El Ghazi was found guilty of norandrosterone doping. The sample was delivered on 10 August 2006 at the 2006 African Championships in Bambous, Mauritius, where she originally won the silver medal. She received a suspension from September 2006 to September 2008, as well as disqualification of all results accomplished since the day she was tested.

See also 
 List of sportspeople sanctioned for doping offenses

References 

1979 births
Living people
Doping cases in athletics
Moroccan female hammer throwers
Moroccan sportspeople in doping cases
Moroccan female athletes
20th-century Moroccan women
21st-century Moroccan women